The Ice Machine is an album by Breaking Circus.  It was released in 1986 by on Homestead Records.

Track listing
Side 1:
"Song of the South" (Steve Björklund, Pete Conway, and Todd Trainer)
"Ancient Axes" (Björklund)
"Daylight" (Björklund)
"Caskets and Clocks" (Trainer)
"Deadly China Doll" (Björklund)
"Laid So Low" (Björklund)

Side 2:
"Took a Hammering" (Björklund and Trainer)
"Walter" (Björklund)
"Swept Blood" (Conway)
"Where" (Trainer)
"Gun Shy" (Björklund, Conway, and Trainer)
"Evil Last Night" (Björklund)

Personnel
Steve Björklund - guitar, vocals
Flour - bass
Todd Trainer - drums, vocals
Iain Burgess - producer
Steve Albini - liner artwork

References

Albums produced by Iain Burgess
Breaking Circus albums
1986 albums
Homestead Records albums